Veronicella sloanii, commonly called the pancake slug, is a species of air-breathing land slug, a terrestrial, pulmonate gastropod mollusk in the family Veronicellidae, the leatherleaf slugs.

Description 
When extended, this slug can attain a length of 12 cm (5 in.). It is highly variable in coloration and positive identification depends on dissection and inspection of the genitalia. It is usually very pale in color, ranging from mottle pale yellow, cream to white. It may have irregular black spotting or speckling all over the dorsal surface that may coalesce into two poorly defined bands running down either side of the body; in the juveniles, these two bands may be clearer and better defined as grey bands, especially anteriorly. Occasionally the slug can be mostly brownish. The only constant color character among different Caribbean island populations is the eye stalk, which is bluish grey with a light brown tip.

Distribution 
The indigenous distribution of Veronicella sloanii is Jamaica. The type locality is in Jamaica.

Other non-indigenous distribution includes:
 Barbados
 Bermuda
 Dominica - first report from Dominica in 2009
 Dominican Republic
 Saint Lucia
 Saint Vincent
 Cuba (Bahia Honda in Pinar del Río Province).

This slug has been introduced to Florida and it has become an agricultural pest there.

Controversially Cowie et al. (2009) considered this species has not yet become established in the US, but it is considered to represent a potentially serious threat as a pest, an invasive species which could negatively affect agriculture, natural ecosystems, human health or commerce. Therefore, it has been suggested that this species be given top national quarantine significance in the USA.

Ecology

Habitat 
This slug lives in moist conditions and is nocturnal.

The best times to hunt for the slug is after rainfall. They rest under boards, logs and other objects lying on the ground.

Feeding habits 
This species attacks a wide variety of agricultural and horticultural plants including banana, plantain, various beans and peas, peanut, eggplant, cultivars of Brassica (e.g., broccoli, cabbage, cauliflower), carrot, hot and sweet peppers, various citrus species, lettuce, sweet potato, dasheen, eddoe, tannia, tomato, and yam.

Life cycle 
The slug lays a clutch of about 30 eggs, which are about 5 mm in diameter. The hatching time in captivity was 15 days at 24 °C.

Importance for humans 
This species is an agricultural pest.

They should not be handled with bare hands because they serve as intermediate hosts of the nematode Angiostrongylus costaricensis, which causes a disease called human abdominal angiostrongyliasis.

References 
This article incorporates public text a public domain work of the United States Government from the reference

Further reading 
  Quattrini D. & Lanza B. (15 December 1968). "Observations on the gonads of Veronicella sloanei (Cuvier) (Gastropoda soleolifera veronicellidae)". Boll Soc Ital Biol Sper. 44(23): 2023-2026.

External links 
 Images from http://www.kingsnake.com/westindian/metazoa1.html
 http://www.kingsnake.com/westindian/tveronicellasloanei1.JPG
 http://www.kingsnake.com/westindian/veronicellasloanei2.JPG

 

Veronicellidae
Gastropods described in 1817
Taxa named by Georges Cuvier